Natan Rybak (Рибак, Натан; 3 January 1913 – 11 September 1978) was a Ukrainian poet and socialist-realist writer of Jewish origin.
Rybak published 3 collections of poetry in the 1930s. 
He published around 20 collections of short stories mostly in the 1930s and 1940s. 
He is best known for his novels. 
He was awarded the Stalin Prize in 1950 for volume 1 of the novel Pereiaslavs’ka rada. 
The novel Pomylka Onore de Bal’zaka was filmed in 1969.

Bibliography 
The bibliography is a selection from Encyclopedia of Ukraine.
Harmaty zherlamy na skhid (1934) (in English Cannons with Muzzles Facing East)
Kyïv (1936) (Kiev)
Dnipro (2 volumes, 1937–8) (The Dnieper)
Pomylka Onore de Bal’zaka (1940) (in English  The Mistake of Honoré de Balzac filmed in 1969)
Zbroia z namy (1943) (in English  The Weapons Are with Us)
Pereiaslavs’ka rada (volume 1 in 1948, was awarded the Stalin Prize in 1950 and volume 2 in 1953) (in English  The Pereiaslav Council)
Trilogien Chas spodivan’ i zvershen’  (1960) (in English  A Time of Expectations and Achievements) 
Soldaty bez mundyriv (1966) (in English  Soldiers without Uniforms)
Collections of his works was published in 5 volumes in 1963–4 og 1981.

References 

1913 births
1978 deaths
People from Kirovohrad Oblast
People from Yelisavetgradsky Uyezd
Ukrainian Jews
Communist Party of the Soviet Union members
Ukrainian writers
Stalin Prize winners
Burials at Baikove Cemetery
Soviet poets